Lonnie Loach (born April 14, 1968) is a Canadian former professional ice hockey player. Loach spent the majority of his career in the IHL but also played briefly in the NHL with the Ottawa Senators, Los Angeles Kings, and Mighty Ducks of Anaheim. He played left wing and shot left-handed.

Playing career
After one season with the Guelph Platers of the OHL Loach was drafted by the Chicago Blackhawks in the fifth round, 98th overall in the 1986 NHL Entry Draft. After being drafted, Loach returned to the Platers and played another 2 years with the team. Loach then turned pro and played the next 3 years in the IHL. During the 1990–1991 season, Loach led the IHL with 131 points in 81 games and helped lead the Fort Wayne Komets to the Turner Cup Finals.

Following the 1990–1991 season, Loach signed as a free agent with the Detroit Red Wings. He spent one year with the Red Wings' minor league affiliate Adirondack Red Wings, scoring 86 points in 67 games during the 1991–1992 season. In 1992 Loach was claimed in the Expansion Draft by the Ottawa Senators.

The 1992–1993 season saw Loach finally make his NHL debut. He appeared in 3 games with the Senators early in the season, but was eventually released. Loach was quickly picked up by the Los Angeles Kings however, and he earned a spot on the Kings roster. He played in 50 games, scoring 23 points. Following the season, Loach was again claimed in the Expansion Draft, this time by the Mighty Ducks of Anaheim. He was unable to crack the Mighty Ducks roster for the 1993–1994 season, spending the majority of the year with the San Diego Gulls while appearing in 3 games with the Mighty Ducks. This would be the last time Loach would play in the NHL.

Loach spent the next 5 years in the IHL. His most successful season during this time was during the 1995–1996 season when he scored 86 points with the Detroit Vipers. Loach would also make stops with the San Antonio Dragons, Long Beach Ice Dogs, and Kansas City Blades.

Loach then played from the 1999–2000 season until the 2002–2003 season with the Missouri River Otters of the UHL. Over 4 seasons he scored 310 points in 238 games with the River Otters. During the 2002–2003 season Loach also made an appearance with the Los Angeles Kings minor league affiliate Manchester Monarchs, playing 3 games. Loach retired from hockey following the 2002–2003 season. For the 2003–2004 season Loach was hired as the head coach of the River Otters and coached the team for the majority of the year, but was replaced after 70 games and a dismal 16–47–7 record.

Loach came out of retirement for the 2005–2006 season with the River Otters, skating in 21 games with the team before retiring again in 2006. He had his #33 retired by the River Otters, the only player to have his number retired by the team.

Awards
 1986: OHL Rookie of the Year
 1991: IHL Second All-Star Team
 1991: Leo P. Lamoureux Memorial Trophy (leading scorer in IHL)

Community involvement
For several years during the mid 1990s, Lonnie Loach had helped hundreds and hundreds of children across Northern Ontario by running his own hockey school for kids.  He started this while playing for the Detroit Red Wings and brought along with him former teammate Keith Primeau.

Lonnie's hockey school was a huge success amongst the Northern Ontario crowd.  It ran for three years and even spawned one professional NHL hockey player, Fellow Hockey Heritage North Alumni, "The Zack Morris" of KLCVI, Kurtis McLean.

Lonnie has also helped raise money for local charities in Northern Ontario by lending his services to charity hockey tournaments in Northern Ontario. One in particular is the Canadian Tire Rino Robazza Memorial Hockey tournament.

Career statistics

Regular season and playoffs

Coaching statistics
Season  Team                  Lge       Type GP  W  L T OTL   Pct 
2003-04 Missouri River Otters UHL Head Coach 70 16 47 0   7 0.279

References

External links
 

1968 births
Adirondack Red Wings players
Chicago Blackhawks draft picks
Chicago Wolves players
Detroit Vipers players
Flint Spirits players
Fort Wayne Komets players
Guelph Platers players
HDD Olimpija Ljubljana players
Indianapolis Ice players
Kansas City Blades players
Living people
Long Beach Ice Dogs (IHL) players
Los Angeles Kings players
Manchester Monarchs (AHL) players
Mighty Ducks of Anaheim players
Missouri River Otters players
Ottawa Senators players
Sportspeople from Temiskaming Shores
Phoenix Roadrunners (IHL) players
Saginaw Hawks players
San Antonio Dragons players
San Diego Gulls (IHL) players
Canadian ice hockey left wingers